Death Domination is an album by Swedish band Impious. It was released on November 23, 2009, in Europe and on November 24, 2009, in North America through Metal Blade Records.

Track listing
Abomination Glorified 02:29
The Demand 02:55
I Am the King 03:07
And the Empire Shall Fall 05:30
Dead Awakening 03:33
Hate Killing Project 03:34
Rostov Ripper 04:24
Legions 03:09
As Death Lives in Me 04:18
Irreligious State of War 03:12

2007 albums
Impious albums